Lifesaving at the 2019 Military World Games was held in Wuhan, China from 20 to 22 October 2019.

Medal summary

References 
 2019 Military World Games

Lifesaving
2019